Basheer Bagh Palace or Bashir Bagh Palace was a palace located in Hyderabad, Telangana, India. It was constructed by Sir Asman Jah, a Paigah noble and Prime Minister of Hyderabad state (1887–1894).

History
It was once a palace with great architecture and magnificent interior. The palace was dismantled by the state government after Indian independence, but the area is still known as Basheerbagh.

This place has the distinction of playing host to the Hindustani classical maestro, Bade Ghulam Ali Khan, who stayed here in his final years of his life, patronized by Nawab Zahir Yar Jung. He died at this palace on 25 April 1968.

References

External links

Picture of Bashir Bagh Palace 
Picture of the palace

Hyderabad State
Palaces of Nizams of Hyderabad
Palaces of Paigah of Hyderabad